Marvel's Spider-Man is a series of action-adventure video games developed by Insomniac Games and published by Sony Interactive Entertainment for PlayStation consoles and Microsoft Windows. Based on characters appearing in Marvel Comics publications, the games are inspired by the long-running comic book lore, while additionally deriving from various adaptations in other media. The series principally follows protagonists Peter Parker and Miles Morales, who fight crime in New York City as Spider-Men while dealing with the complications of their civilian lives.

Marvel Games entered negotiations with SIE regarding developing AAA games based on their characters, leading to frequent collaborative studio Insomniac Games being selected to acquire the license for the Spider-Man character from Activision in 2014. The series began with Marvel's Spider-Man and its subsequent downloadable content (DLC) expansion The City That Never Sleeps, which released on the PlayStation 4 in late 2018; the game and its DLC were later collected together and released as a remastered version for the PlayStation 5 in November 2020 and Windows in August 2022. A direct spin-off title, Marvel's Spider-Man: Miles Morales, was released on the PlayStation 4 and PlayStation 5 in November 2020 alongside Marvel's Spider-Man Remastered, with a Windows port released in November 2022. A sequel to the original game and the Miles Morales spin-off, Marvel's Spider-Man 2, is currently in development for the PlayStation 5 for release in late 2023.

The series is also supported by other standalone titles which share the same continuity with the Spider-Man games. Marvel's Iron Man VR, a standalone game developed by Camouflaj and focused on the titular character, was released on the PlayStation VR in July 2020, and was ported to Meta Quest 2 in November 2022. Marvel's Wolverine, a second standalone game developed by Insomniac Games and focused on the titular character, is currently in development for the PlayStation 5.

Both currently released main entries in the Marvel's Spider-Man series have been met with positive commercial success and critical acclaim, with praise for their narratives, characters, voice acting, graphics, and gameplay. Marvel's Iron Man VR meanwhile, received mixed critical reception due to its repetitive campaign. The series has collectively sold more than 33 million copies worldwide. Various tie-in novels by Titan Books and comic books published by Marvel Comics have been released, expanding the games' universe. Insomniac's version of Peter Parker also appears in the comic book event Spider-Geddon (2018), which designated the series as taking place on "Earth-1048" in the larger Marvel Comics multiverse. Parker will also appear in the upcoming animated film Spider-Man: Across the Spider-Verse (2023).

Conception and development

Video games featuring Marvel Comics characters were primarily developed and published by Activision since 1998, with the character Spider-Man appearing in multiple titles both as the primary playable character and as a supporting character since 2000. However, as Marvel Games vice president Jay Ong would come to reflect on in 2016, the terms of Marvel and Activision's deal necessitated quicker development periods on games in order to tie such products into upcoming films based around Marvel properties. Ong would reminisce about how it was "difficult to succeed" under those circumstances as a result of instances where, "there wasn't enough time to come out with something truly terrific". Dissatisfied with the eventual output of the publisher, Marvel Games would elect to terminate their partnership with Activision in 2014 just prior to the release of the movie tie-in game, The Amazing Spider-Man 2. During a meeting with executives from the publishing firm, Ong would be asked by Activision, "What are you going to do with this IP after you get it back?". Ong would cite a need to "find a better home for it" in response, with the publisher's representative taunting him in return, "Good luck finding your unicorn".

To rejuvenate the IP, Ong's primary objective was to find "a publishing partner who hadn't adopted the "crappy licensed games" mentality", as well as one with "a vested interest that would benefit from building a franchise". In particular, Marvel Games were looking to create a gaming IP around one of their characters that would rival the likes of the Batman: Arkham series from WB Games and Rocksteady Studios, credited with legitimizing and popularizing video game adaptations based on comic book characters. The primary candidates considered for spearheading Marvel's new commitment to AAA games were Microsoft Studios, Sony Interactive Entertainment and Nintendo. Nintendo was ruled out initially as a result of their perceived dedication to pursuing games using their own characters and franchises (though they would eventually collaborate with Marvel in developing Marvel Ultimate Alliance 3: The Black Order (2019) for Nintendo Switch), while Microsoft turned down Marvel's offer due to a desire to focus on building their own IP. Eventually, Jay Ong would meet with Sony executives Adam Boyes and John Drake, in order to pitch an overall development deal with Marvel, with the hope that they could collaborate and "beat Arkham and have one game at least and maybe multiple games that could drive adoption", of Sony's PlayStation platforms.

SIE eventually signed off on the deal, prompting their Vice President of Product Development Connie Booth to visit developer Insomniac Games in order to speak with studio CEO Ted Price, with discussions about the potential Marvel project being held off-the-record. Price was described as being "fairly neutral" towards the prospects of developing a game based on a Marvel Comics property, as Insomniac up to that point purely worked on their own original franchises. However, his development team were comparatively enthusiastic about the project. As Marvel allowed Insomniac to select any of their characters to adapt, the team decided on Spider-Man as a result of being able to relate to the dynamic presented between the heroic Spider-Man and his everyman alter-ego, Peter Parker. They would also come to find the task of adapting the character daunting, as a result of his popularity, in addition to the numerous existing stories and interpretations of the character both in comics and in other media. However, they also welcomed the challenge, particularly art director Jacinda Chew, who consulted online resources and various Marvel staff in order to cultivate extensive knowledge of the character.

Creative director Bryan Intihar said "I feel like he's the most relatable of the heroes. As much as I love Tony Stark, it's harder to identify with a billionaire. As much as I love Thor, it's hard to identify with a god. Peter makes mistakes, he has ups and downs in his career, his relationships, his family. I think we can all relate to that." Price said, "He's so human, and he's so relatable. He's also the most popular Marvel character in the world, I think". Price also considered the technical benefits; Sunset Overdrive has a dynamic traversal system that could be built upon for Spider-Man. Spider-Man became the first licensed property developed by Insomniac in its then 22-year existence.

Upon the announcement of the spin-off title Marvel's Spider-Man: Miles Morales for the PlayStation 4 and PlayStation 5. Sony vice president Simon Rutter told The Telegraph that the game was "an expansion and an enhancement to the previous game". However, Insomniac later called the project a standalone game, stating that it is "the next adventure in the Marvel's Spider-Man universe". It is smaller in size and scope than Spider-Man, and has been compared to Uncharted: The Lost Legacy, a game which served as a standalone expansion that was smaller in size and scope than a mainline Uncharted title. The game was additionally described as featuring "a new story, with new set-pieces, fresh villains, and unique quests".

During the development of Marvel's Spider-Man, Insomniac, Marvel and SIE discussed prospects for future games based on Marvel Comics properties beyond Spider-Man, with the team at Insomniac continually suggesting their desire to work on a game featuring Wolverine. The development team were drawn to the character through the similar moral compass he shares with Spider-Man, notably the fact that "both heroes feel deeply compelled to defend people who are less able to do so". Insomniac eventually elected to pitch this idea to both Marvel and Sony as their next licensed property following their successful collaboration with the two parties on developing Marvel's Spider-Man. Marvel's Wolverine is currently being developed alongside Marvel's Spider-Man 2 (2023), which was jointly announced in September 2021. For the latter game, Bryan Intihar and Ryan Smith serve as the game's creative and game directors, respectively reprising their roles from Spider-Man.

In June 2022, Sony Interactive Entertainment announced that the games in the Marvel's Spider-Man series would begin releasing on Microsoft Windows alongside the existing PlayStation versions starting with Spider-Man Remastered in August 2022, and Miles Morales later that November, marking another push by the publisher to release its various PlayStation Studios titles on PC. Insomniac Games further confirmed that support studio Nixxes Software, whom Sony acquired in July 2021, would help port the games to PC.

Video games

Marvel's Spider-Man games (2018–present)

Marvel's Spider-Man (2018)

Marvel's Spider-Man is the first entry in the series, released for the PlayStation 4 in September 2018. Taking place eight years into Peter Parker's career as Spider-Man, it focuses on the super-human crime lord Mister Negative, and his plot to seize control of New York City's criminal underworld. When he threatens to release a deadly virus with the assistance of a group of escaped supervillains known as the Sinister Six, Spider-Man must confront him and save the city while dealing with the personal problems of his civilian persona. He is accompanied in his efforts by former Daily Bugle colleague and ex-girlfriend Mary Jane Watson, New York City Police Department (NYPD) captain Yuri Watanabe, and Miles Morales, son of NYPD officer Jefferson Davis.

The City that Never Sleeps (2018)

Insomniac supported the game with a downloadable content (DLC) campaign, The City that Never Sleeps, consisting of three episodes that were released monthly from October to December 2018. Taking place a few months following the events of the base game, the DLC sees Spider-Man combat a new crime wave led by the physically enhanced mob boss Hammerhead, with the assistance of expert thief and former lover Felicia Hardy, and Silver Sablinova, the owner and operator of the mercenary group Sable International.

Marvel's Spider-Man Remastered (2020)
Marvel's Spider-Man Remastered collects both the original game and all three chapters of The City That Never Sleeps. The remaster additionally boasts numerous graphical and presentation improvements, namely the implementation of two game presets: "Fidelity Mode" for increasing the game's graphical detail and enabling real-time ray tracing, and "Performance Mode" for scaling the resolution dynamically while increasing the game's framerate. A third presentation option, "Performance RT", was added following the game's launch in order to enable real-time ray tracing while increasing performance capabilities. Other features include "near-instant loading" accomplished by the console SSD as well as support for both Sony's 3D Audio technology and the DualSense controller's haptic feedback. The remaster introduces a reworked in-game model for Peter Parker motion captured by Ben Jordan, replacing original actor John Bubinak, and also includes additional suits not initially available in the original PlayStation 4 release, including the exclusive "Black and Gold Suit" & "Hybrid Suit", inspired by the suits worn by Peter Parker in the Marvel Cinematic Universe (MCU) film Spider-Man: No Way Home (2021).

The game was initially released worldwide in November 2020 as a launch title for the PlayStation 5, and was bundled alongside the Ultimate Edition of Marvel's Spider-Man: Miles Morales on the console. Alternatively, it is obtainable through upgrading the PS4 version of Miles Morales and purchasing the remaster individually, and allowed cross-save functionality between it and the original PS4 version of Marvel's Spider-Man. A Windows version of the remaster developed by PlayStation sister studio Nixxes Software was announced in June 2022, and released as a standalone title on Steam and the Epic Games Store worldwide in August 2022. The PC version of the remaster boasts numerous specific improvements, such as NVIDIA DLSS and DLAA support, compatibility with ultrawide and panoramic display monitors, an additional presentation preset known as "Ultimate RT" for capable NVIDIA and AMD graphics cards, native support for various controllers and mouse & keyboard input, and options for unlocked framerates to enhance game performance.

Marvel's Spider-Man: Miles Morales (2020)

Marvel's Spider-Man: Miles Morales was released in November 2020 on the PlayStation 4, and as a launch title for the PlayStation 5, and was released for Windows in November 2022. It follows Parker's friend Miles Morales, who acquired similar spider-based powers at the end of the first game and was subsequently trained by Parker. When both Parker and Mary Jane Watson go on an excursion to Symkaria for a few weeks, Miles is left to defend New York as its sole Spider-Man, and must protect his new home, Harlem, after it becomes caught in the crossfire of a war between the Roxxon Energy Corporation and a high-tech criminal army called the Underground, led by the mysterious Tinkerer.

Marvel's Spider-Man 2 (2023)

Marvel's Spider-Man 2 is set to release on the PlayStation 5 in mid-2023. It will feature both Peter Parker and Miles Morales as its main playable protagonists, with the characters Venom and Kraven the Hunter appearing as the game's primary antagonists.

Standalone games (2020–present)

Marvel's Iron Man VR (2020)

Marvel's Iron Man VR was released in July 2020 on the PlayStation VR, and later ported to the Meta Quest 2 and released by Oculus Studios in November 2022. Published by Sony Interactive Entertainment, it features a standalone narrative set within the same continuity as the Marvel's Spider-Man games. Director Ryan Payton later stated that despite the developer's intent to tell a standalone narrative, "there are definitely opportunities to link the worlds" and he hoped that the two-game series could share some references to each other in future installments.

Marvel's Wolverine (TBA)

In September 2021, Insomniac Games announced at the PlayStation Showcase event that they were in early development for a standalone game, titled Marvel's Wolverine, based on the character of the same name. It features a standalone narrative set within the same continuity as the studios Spider-Man games. It will be released for the PlayStation 5. The game is speculated by insiders to be released between late 2023 and 2025.

Characters

Other media

Music
Both of the currently released games in the Marvel's Spider-Man series have been composed by John Paesano. The respective soundtracks for Marvel's Spider-Man and Marvel's Spider-Man: Miles Morales have been collected in digital streaming and physical vinyl formats in collaboration with Mondo. Additionally, three vocal tracks were produced for the Miles Morales original soundtrack: "I'm Ready" by Jaden Smith, and "Where We Come From" and "This is My Time" by Lecrae.

Comics

City at War (2019)
 was published by Marvel Comics as their first title under their Gamerverse label in March 2019, serving as a comic book adaptation of Marvel's Spider-Man's main campaign narrative, while expanding on specific story events. The adaptation was written by Dennis Hopeless, with art by Luca Maresca and colorist David Curiel.

Velocity (2019)
, published later in 2019, depicts an original narrative set within the continuity of the game. The story takes place between the events of the main campaign in Marvel's Spider-Man, and the events of the three-part downloadable content (DLC) campaign, The City That Never Sleeps, and explores the origin behind Parker's creation of the Velocity Suit, in addition to his encounter with the supervillain Swarm, and a separate investigation conducted by Mary Jane Watson and her colleague from the Daily Bugle, Ben Urich, into Haley Harvey, otherwise nicknamed the Speed Demon.

The Black Cat Strikes (2020)
, published in 2020, is a limited series adapting the events of the first installment of The City That Never Sleeps campaign, "The Heist". Dennis Hopeless and Luca Maresca reprise their duties as story writer and artist, respectively. In addition to directly adapting the events from the game's narrative, the story additionally expands on Peter Parker and Felicia Hardy's relationship and history, through scenarios not depicted in the DLC chapters.

Novels

Hostile Takeover (2018)
 was written by David Liss and published by Titan Books on August 21, 2018. It is a prequel novel covering events before the main campaign of Marvel's Spider-Man, detailing Peter Parker's continued efforts to expose businessman Wilson Fisk's activities as the Kingpin of Crime, his encounter with the doppelganger vigilante Blood Spider, and his confrontation with Fisk's surrogate niece and assailant, Maya Lopez / Echo, who is convinced by Fisk that Spider-Man killed her father.

Wings of Fury (2020)
 was written by Brittney Morris and published by Titan Books on November 10, 2020. It is a prequel novel taking place between the events of the downloadable content (DLC) campaign The City That Never Sleeps (2018) and the standalone game Marvel's Spider-Man: Miles Morales (2020). The story depicts Morales' early partnership with Peter Parker / Spider-Man, as the two vigilantes set out to apprehend Adrian Toomes / Vulture, who has broken out of the Raft and teamed with his daughter Tiana Toomes, going under the alias "Starling".

Art books

Marvel's Spider-Man (2018)
 was published by Titan Books on September 11, 2018. Written by Paul Davies, it compiles numerous concept art pieces and renders of the game's primary cast, and various elements such as locations, costumes and tech, paired with additional insight into the game's creative process from developers, artists and designers who worked on the game.

Marvel's Spider-Man: Miles Morales (2021)
, authored by Matt Ralphs, was published by Titan Books on February 23, 2021. It compiles concept illustrations and various in-game renderings of characters, tech, locations, gadgets and costumes from throughout the development period of the title.

Appearances in outside media

Integration into Marvel Comics' multiverse

Insomniac's Peter Parker appeared in the crossover event "Spider-Geddon" (2018), a sequel to the 2014 storyline "Spider-Verse" written by Christos Gage and published by Marvel Comics on September 26, 2018, following the character's debut appearance in Marvel's Spider-Man. It established the game's events as taking place in the universe of "Earth-1048" within the larger Marvel Multiverse. In the story, Parker joins forces with the Superior Spider-Army led by Otto Octavius / Superior Spider-Man, in order to combat the recently liberated Inheritors and avert the deaths of all Spider-People across the multiverse. The story of Spider-Geddon takes place after the events of the game, and also introduces the universe's version of Tarantula, with Octavius secretly leaving a message for his game counterpart, to allow him to potentially also become the Superior Spider-Man.

Film
Parker's Advanced Suit from Marvel's Spider-Man is depicted in the Spider-Lair among the lineup of alternate suits worn by the Peter Parker of Miles Morales' reality in the animated film Spider-Man: Into the Spider-Verse (2018). Parker himself will make a physical appearance in its sequel Spider-Man: Across the Spider-Verse (2023), as a member of the Spider-Forces led by Miguel O' Hara / Spider-Man 2099.

Related video games
The Marvel's Spider-Man series, among other titles developed by Insomniac Games, was referenced in Astro's Playroom (2020), a pack-in game for the PlayStation 5 released at the console's launch, which featured numerous allusions to various franchises published on or exclusive to PlayStation consoles. When entering the Caching Caves area, turning south-east of the Shock Walls leads to a room with an Astro Bot hanging upside-down from a web on the ceiling, referencing a pose commonly associated with the character.

Reception

The two currently released games in the Marvel's Spider-Man series have been met with favorable reception and commercial success. Critics have cited Marvel's Spider-Man (2018) as one of the best comic book-based games ever created, with outlets such as VentureBeat and Game Informer positively comparing the game to Batman: Arkham Asylum (2009), a game that was similarly praised for breaking conventions associated with games based on comic book characters with its reinterpretation of the mythos. The game's mechanics were another point of praise, with many lauding the innovations and refinements made to the web-swinging and traversal systems. EGMNOW commented on the gameplay in Marvel's Spider-Man being more streamlined compared to the similar functions present in the video game adaptation Spider-Man 2 (2004). The combat was similarly praised for its fluidity and emphasis on gadgetry and utilization of the environment for performing attacks., with IGN further observing how the depth of the game's combat system allowed for improvization. The story received particular praise from critics and fans. USGamer specifically cited the narrative as the game's strongest aspect and highlighted the story's interpretation of the title character and his supporting cast, while GamesRadar+ described its characters as being voiced and performed with unexpected depth and charisma. The Remastered port for PlayStation 5 and PC received additional praise for its updated presentation, improvements to technical details such as facial and hair textures, and additional quality-of-life improvements that brought the game in closer parity with Miles Morales, although the replacement of John Bubinak with Ben Jordan as the facial capture model for Peter Parker garnered a mixed response. The PC version was particularly applauded for its optimization for the platform and seamless compatibility on the Steam Deck.

Marvel's Spider-Man: Miles Morales (2020) also enjoyed similarly favorable reviews. Jonathon Dornbush of IGN enjoyed the new PS5 enhancements of the game and the more compelling side content. Destructoids Chris Carter praised the game's story and Miles' new abilities. Andrew Reiner of Game Informer appreciated the improvements to combat and the area of Harlem.

Sales
As of May 2022, the Marvel's Spider-Man series has sold over 33 million copies worldwide. Marvel's Spider-Man (2018) managed to sell 3.3 million units—including those bundled with PlayStation 4 consoles, within its first three days of release, resulting in the title surpassing the 3.1 million unit mark previously achieved by God of War (2018) to become the fastest selling first-party video game release in Sony Interactive Entertainment's history, as well as the fastest-selling PlayStation 4 exclusive entirely, up until that record was usurped by Final Fantasy VII Remake (2020) from Square Enix at 3.5 million units within the same timeframe. The news outlet USA Today additionally estimated that the game made at least $198 million during said period for Sony, surpassing the $117 million domestic box office total accumulated by the Marvel Cinematic Universe (MCU) film Spider-Man: Homecoming in 2017. Additionally, sales projections from The NPD Group touted that Marvel's Spider-Man had garnered 37% higher release-month sales than the combined totals for every previous Spider-Man game released since 1995. By July 2019, Marvel's Spider-Man became the best-selling game based on a comic book character, beating out the combined lifetime sales of Batman: Arkham City (2011) from WB Games and Rocksteady, after having already achieved the title of the fastest-selling comic book-based game in the U.S. in November 2018. The game additionally became one of the best-selling Western-developed PlayStation 4 titles in Japan, being surpassed only by Call of Duty: Black Ops 4 (2018) and Minecraft (2011), as well as the best-selling Western-developed SIE title since Crash Bandicoot: Warped for the original PlayStation, developed by Naughty Dog in 1998. The game's Remastered release for Windows debuted with a concurrent peak of 63,384 players on the Steam platform, making it the second largest debut for a PlayStation Studios title on Steam following God of War.

The PlayStation 4 version of Marvel's Spider-Man: Miles Morales (2020) sold 22,882 physical copies within its first week on sale in Japan, making it the eighth-best-selling retail game of the week in the country. During the same week, the PlayStation 5 version was the tenth-best-selling retail game in Japan, selling 18,640 physical copies. Marvel's Spider-Man: Miles Morales was also the best-selling physical PlayStation 5 launch game in the UK. In Germany, the game sold over 100,000 copies in its launch month and 200,000 copies by the end of December 2020. As of December 18, 2020, the game has sold a combined total of 663,000 digital copies across both the PlayStation 4 and PlayStation 5 platforms. On April 22, 2021, Jeff Grubb of VentureBeat reported that the game had outsold both The Last of Us Part II and Ghost of Tsushima (both 2020) with regards to lifetime sales. As of July 18, 2021, the game had sold over 6.5 million copies. Miles Morales was the twelfth best-selling game of 2020, and the sixth best-selling game of 2021.

In May 2022, the Marvel's Spider-Man series was reported to have sold over 33 million copies.

Accolades

See also
 Spider-Man in video games
 Iron Man in other media
 Wolverine in other media
 Marvel Games

Notes

References

External links
 Official Insomniac Games website
 Games page on Marvel.com

 
Action-adventure games
Beat 'em ups
Insomniac Games
Superhero video games
Video game franchises
Video game franchises introduced in 2018
Sony Interactive Entertainment games